This article describes various bootleg recordings that have subsequently seen a commercial release. Because bootlegs are issued without the consent of an artist's record label, that artist may not receive any royalties from its release, and there is no guarantee of the sound quality and authenticity of the bootleg. To counteract this, while still meeting demand for the recordings, some artists have given bootleg recordings an official release.

See also
 The Beatles bootleg recordings
 Bob Dylan bootleg recordings
 Led Zeppelin bootleg recordings
 Pink Floyd bootleg recordings
 Pearl Jam Official Bootlegs

References